Charlotta Maria Thérèse Lizinka Dyrssen, née af Ugglas (28 July 1866 – 9 September 1952), was a Swedish women's rights activist. She served as chairperson of the Swedish Red Cross 1902–1906, the Stockholm branch of the National Association for Women's Suffrage in 1909–1910, the Moderate Association for Women's Suffrage in 1917–1921, the Fredrika Bremer Association in 1921–1937, and the Moderate Women.

Dyrssen was born to Baron  and Thérèse Björnstjerna, and married Admiral and Naval Minister Wilhelm Dyrssen (1858–1929) in 1888. She was mother to Gustaf Dyrssen (1891–1981) and Magnus Dyrssen (1894–1940). She died on 9 September 1952 in Stockholm.

She was awarded the Illis quorum, medals from the German, Austrian, and Polish Red Cross organizations, the Finnish Cross of Liberty, fourth class; and the Swedish volunteer health service.

Sources

Further reading 
  
        

1866 births
1952 deaths
Swedish women's rights activists
Swedish suffragists
People from Upplands-Bro Municipality
Recipients of the Illis quorum